Denmark competed at the 2014 Winter Olympics in Sochi, Russia, from 7 to 23 February 2014. A team of 12 athletes in 3 sports are competing for the team. Their best placements were sixth in men's and women's curling.

Alpine skiing 

According to the quota allocation released on 20 January 2014, Denmark has qualified three athletes. However Denmark elected to send only one athlete who met the qualification set by the Olympic Committee.

Cross-country skiing 

According to the quota allocation released on 20 January 2014, Denmark has qualified two athletes. However Denmark elected to only send one athlete, who met the qualification set by the Olympic Committee.

Distance

Sprint

Curling 

Based on results from 2012 and the 2013 World Curling Championships, Denmark has qualified their men's and women's team as one of the seven highest ranked nations. On 24 August 2013, the team selections were announced; all athletes who took part in the qualification were selected.

Men's tournament 

Team: Rasmus Stjerne (skip), Mikkel Adrup Poulsen, Johnny Frederiksen, Troels Harry and Lars Vilandt (alternate).

Round robin

Round-robin

Draw 1
Monday, 10 February, 9:00 am

Draw 2
Monday, 10 February, 7:00 pm

Draw 4
Wednesday, 12 February, 9:00 am

Draw 5
Wednesday, 12 February, 7:00 pm

Draw 6
Thursday, 13 February, 2:00 pm

Draw 8
Friday, 14 February, 7:00 pm

Draw 9
Saturday, 15 February, 2:00 pm

Draw 11
Sunday, 16 February, 7:00 pm

Draw 12
Monday, 17 February, 2:00 pm

Women's tournament 

Team: Lene Nielsen (skip), Helle Nordfred Simonsen, Jeanne Ellegaard, Maria Poulsen and Mette de Neergaard (alternate).

Round robin

Round-robin

Draw 1
Monday, 10 February, 2:00 pm

Draw 2
Tuesday, 11 February, 9:00 am

Draw 3
Tuesday, 11 February, 7:00 pm

Draw 5
Thursday, 13 February, 9:00 am

Draw 6
Thursday, 13 February, 7:00 pm

Draw 7
Friday, 14 February, 2:00 pm

Draw 9
Saturday, 15 February, 7:00 pm

Draw 10
Sunday, 16 February, 2:00 pm

Draw 12
Monday, 17 February, 7:00 pm

References

External links 

 
 

Nations at the 2014 Winter Olympics
2014 Winter Olympics
Olympics